The Kikwete Cabinet was formed by President Jakaya Kikwete after taking the oath of office on 21 December 2005. Kikwete had won a landslide victory in the 2005 presidential election receiving 80.2 percent of the popular vote. His inaugural cabinet had seven women ministers, the highest in the nation's history.

First term

Inaugural Cabinet 
Kikwete's first appointment was Johnson Mwanyika as Attorney General. Mwanyika was sworn in on 24 December 2005. Edward Lowassa was then nominated as Prime Minister and was approved overwhelmingly by the National Assembly. He was sworn in on 30 December 2005; the same day President Kikwete inaugurated the 9th Parliament. The inaugural cabinet ministers took oath of office on 6 January 2006.

First reshuffle 
President Kikwete made his first cabinet reshuffle in October 2006 which resulted in ten ministers swapping their portfolios. The energy crisis at the time may have necessitated the President's decision.

Changes 
Juma Akukweti died on 4 January 2007. He was seriously injured when the small aircraft he was travelling en route to Dar es Salaam crashed in Mbeya shortly after takeoff.
Asha-Rose Migiro was appointed by Ban Ki-moon as the Deputy Secretary-General of the United Nations on 5 January 2007. She was succeeded by Bernard Membe, the Deputy Minister of Energy and Minerals.

Second reshuffle

Changes 
Attorney General Johnson Mwanyika was succeeded by Frederick Werema in 2009.

Second term

November 2010 – May 2012

May 2012 – January 2014

January 2014–January 2015

Changes 
Attorney General Frederick Werema resigned on 16 December 2014 after he was accused of authorizing the transfer of about $120 million from a controversial escrow account. Werema stated that his advice had been misunderstood. He was replaced by George Masaju.
On 22 December 2014, President Kikwete sacked Lands Minister Anna Tibaijuka over a $1 million donation for a school that she received in her personal account. Tibaijuka denied any wrongdoing and insisted that she presented the funds to the school.

January–November 2015

Deputy Ministers

References

External links 
 Government website

Jakaya Kikwete
2006 establishments in Tanzania
Cabinets established in 2006